The name Cesar was used for three tropical cyclones in the Atlantic Ocean.
 Tropical Storm Cesar (1984), moved northeast parallel to the East Coast of the United States, losing tropical characteristics near Newfoundland
 Tropical Storm Cesar (1990), formed west of Cape Verde but dissipated while still 1000 miles (1600 km) east of Bermuda
 Hurricane Cesar (1996), formed off Venezuela and made landfall at Nicaragua as a Category 1 storm; killed 51 (26 in Costa Rica); crossed into the Pacific Ocean and became Hurricane Douglas

The name Cesar was retired after the 1996 season, and was replaced by Cristobal in the 2002 season.

Atlantic hurricane set index articles